"Right Right Now Now" is a song by American rap rock group the Beastie Boys, released as the third single from their sixth studio album To the 5 Boroughs.

The trio, along with Doug E. Fresh, performed the song on the November 11, 2004 episode of Late Night with Conan O'Brien.

Track listing
U.S. CD single
 "Right Right Now Now" (Clean album version)
 "Right Right Now Now" (A cappella version)

Japan CD single
"Right Right Now Now" (Album version) – 2:46
"Rizzle Rizzle Nizzle Nizzle" – 3:04
"MTL Reppin' for the 514" – 2:58
"An Open Letter to NYC" (Album version) – 4:18
"Brrr Stick Em" – 2:26
"Ch-Check It Out" (Just Blaze Remix) – 4:24
"Sabotage" (Live) – 3:30

Charts

2004 singles
2004 songs
Beastie Boys songs
Capitol Records singles
Songs written by Ad-Rock
Songs written by Mike D
Songs written by Adam Yauch
Songs written by Tony Romeo
Song recordings produced by Mario Caldato Jr.
Grand Royal singles